Valery Pavlovich Chkalov (– 15 December 1938) was a test pilot awarded the title Hero of the Soviet Union (1936).

Early life
Chkalov was born to a Russian family in 1904 in the upper Volga region, the town of Vasilyevo (the town is now named Chkalov in his honour), which lies near Nizhny Novgorod.

He was the son of a ship boiler-maker at the Vasselyevo Ship Yard on the River Volga. His mother died when he was six years old. Chkalov studied in the technical school in Cherepovets but later returned to his home town to work as an apprentice in the shipyard alongside his father. He then got a job as a stoker on a river dredger: the Bayan (later renamed the Mikhail Kalinin).

He saw his first plane in 1919 and decided to join the Red Army's air force, joining first at age 16 as a mechanic. He trained as a pilot at the Yegoryevsk Training School and graduated in 1924 joining a fighter squadron.

Chkalov married Olga Orekhova, a schoolteacher from Leningrad, in 1927. In the early 1930s he became a test pilot. His feats included doing 250 loop-the-loops in 45 minutes.

Achievements
From 1935 he led the stunt section of the Russian air force, used in public displays. This included the 1 May celebrations over Red Square at which point he met Stalin for the first time.

Chkalov achieved several milestones in aviation. The flight pioneered the polar air route from Europe to the American Pacific Coast.

He was planning the world's first non-stop flight around the planet when he died.

Death

Chkalov died on 15 December 1938 while piloting a prototype of the Polikarpov I-180 fighter, which crashed during its maiden test flight. The series of events leading up to the crash is not entirely clear. Neither of the aircraft's two chief designers, Nikolai Polikarpov and Dmitry Tomashevich, approved the flight, and no one had signed a form releasing the prototype from the factory. In any case, Chkalov took off and made a low altitude circuit around the airfield. For the second circuit, Chkalov flew farther away, climbing to over 2,000 m (6,560 ft) even though the flight plan specifically forbade exceeding 600 m (1,970 ft). Chkalov apparently miscalculated his landing approach and came in short of the airfield, but when he attempted to correct his approach the engine cut out. Chkalov was able to avoid several buildings, but struck an overhead powerline. He was thrown from the cockpit, sustaining severe injuries, and died two hours later. His ashes are interred in the Kremlin Wall.

The official government investigation concluded that the engine cut out because it became too cold in the absence of the cowl flaps. Others hypothesised that Chkalov had advanced the throttle too fast and thus flooded the engine. As a result of the crash, Tomashevich and several other officials, who urged the first flight, were immediately arrested. Years later, fellow test pilot Mikhail Gromov blamed the designers for flawed engine cooling and Chkalov himself for deviating from the flight plan. Chkalov's son claimed that a plan to assassinate his father had been in the works in the months preceding his death, but the circumstances of the crash make foul play unlikely. Despite the opinion of some, after Chkalov's death Polikarpov's reputation with Stalin was left intact, and Polikarpov continued to design aircraft.

Commemoration

The village of Vasilyevo where Chkalov was born is now the town of Chkalovsk (Nizhny Novgorod Oblast). The city of Orenburg bore the name Chkalov from 1938 to 1957. There was a Chkalov Street in Moscow (part of Moscow's Garden Ring), now renamed Zemlyanoy Val; its namesakes in Nizhny Novgorod and several other Russian cities still exist. Nizhny Novgorod also has a staircase down to the Volga named after him with a statue of him at the top of it. In 1975, at Vancouver Washington,  a monument to Chkalov's 1937 polar flight was dedicated at Pearson Field and a street was named Chkalov Drive.

A  was named Chkalov but was renamed Komsomolets in 1958.

The metro rail systems of Moscow, Saint Petersburg, and Nizhny Novgorod each have a Chkalovskaya station. Yekaterinburg Metro also opened one in 2012.

One of 16 Russia's Tu-160 bombers was named after Valery Chkalov.

A musical duet, Отряд имени Валерия Чкалова ("Detachment named after Valery Chkalov"), recorded their first album in 1983.

A monument to Chkalov in Dnipro, Ukraine was dismantled in December 2022. The monument had been erected in 1981. Chkalov was not connected with Dnipro in any way. In February 2023 a monument to Chkalov in Kyiv, Ukraine was dismantled. It was dismantled as soon as the Ministry of Culture and Information Policy had revoked the monument cultural heritage site status.

See also
Anatoly Serov
Chkalov Island

References

Further reading
 Baĭdukov, G., Over the North Pole (New York: Harcourt, Brace and Company, 1938).
 Id., Russian Lindbergh: The Life of Valery Chkalov (Washington, D.C.: Smithsonian Institution Press, 1991).
 McCannon, John, Red Arctic: Polar Exploration and the Myth of the North in the Soviet Union, 1932–1939 (New York: Oxford University Press, 1998).

External links
 

1904 births
1938 deaths
Aviators killed in aviation accidents or incidents
Burials at the Kremlin Wall Necropolis
Heroes of the Soviet Union
People from Balakhninsky Uyezd
People from Nizhny Novgorod Oblast
Russian aviators
Russian explorers
Soviet Air Force officers
Soviet test pilots
Victims of aviation accidents or incidents in 1938
Victims of aviation accidents or incidents in the Soviet Union
Recipients of the Order of Lenin
Recipients of the Order of the Red Banner